The Odd Couple is an American multi-camera television sitcom that aired on CBS for three seasons from February 19, 2015 to January 30, 2017. It is the seventh screen production based on the 1965 play written by Neil Simon, following the 1968 film, a 1970 television series, a 1975 Saturday morning cartoon, a 1982 reboot of the 1970 series, The Odd Couple: Together Again (a TV film reunion of the 1970 series) and The Odd Couple II (a 1998 sequel to the 1968 film).

This show stars Matthew Perry (who also developed and executive produced the series) as the slovenly Oscar Madison and Thomas Lennon as the obsessively-tidy Felix Unger. Perry and Lennon had previously worked together on the film 17 Again. The show was announced in December 2013 and was picked up by CBS as a midseason offering for the 2014–15 season. The third and final season premiered on October 17, 2016 and contained 13 episodes. 

38 episodes of The Odd Couple aired in all.

Series overview

Episodes

Season 1 (2015)

Season 2 (2016)

Season 3 (2016–17)

References 

Lists of American sitcom episodes